Mahbuba Rahman (born 3 March 1935) is a Bangladeshi singer. She worked in the film industry during 1950s and 1960s. She was the playback singer of Mukh O Mukhosh (1956), the first Bengali language feature film produced in erstwhile East Pakistan (now Bangladesh). She was awarded Ekushey Padak in 1998 by the Government of Bangladesh for her contribution to music.

Career
Rahman started singing at the age of eight. She was mentored by Shambhu Pal. In 1946, she recorded her first song at All India Radio by the music composition of Samar Das.

Rahman released a music album "Mahbuba Rahman er Kaaljoyee Gaan" in 2015.

Filmography
List of playback songs recorded by Rahman –

 Mukh O Mukhosh (1956)
  Amar Golar Haar in Asiya (1960)
  Agun Jalaish Na Amar Gaye in Saat Bhai Champa (1968)
 Moner Bon-e Dola Lagey in the film Shurjo Snan
 Jago Hua Savera
 Kokhono Asheni
 E Desh Tomar Amar
 Sonar Kajol
 Je Nodi Morupothe
 Raja Sannasi
 Nabab Sirajuddowlah

Personal life
Rahman was married to actor-filmmaker Khan Ataur Rahman. Musician Rumana Islam is their daughter.

Awards
 Ekushey Padak (1998) 
 Samar Das Sangeet Padak (2004)
 Golden Jubilee Film Audience award (2006) for the 50s Best Singer

References

External links

Living people
1935 births
20th-century Bangladeshi women singers
20th-century Bangladeshi singers
Bangladeshi playback singers
Recipients of the Ekushey Padak